The  , originally Central Department Store is a Modernist building, originally department store, currently office building, in Warsaw, Poland. It was designed by architects Zbigniew Ihnatowicz and Jerzy Romański and build between 1948 and 1952. Distinct from socialist realism architecture build at the time and proclaimed as aesthetic doctrine in 1949 by communist rule in Poland CDT building aroused controversy. Between 2014 and 2018 it underwent major rebuild by private investor who bought it in 2013, which received unfavourable opinions from architecture community, but was widely acclaimed by the public.

Architecture

The building was designed in the popular pre-war 1920s style of modernism. Built as a detached structure formed from three separate blocks, the first, main, block forms the core of the store itself, with the main façade of the building fronting Aleje Jerozolimskie, the second construction operates as a food hall, whilst the third became a small office building attached to the rear of the main store via the restaurant section at ground floor. The main store was previously famous for its high-modernist windows, which were constructed using Polish oak frames and glass panes with an anti-reflective coating - a first for post-war era Polish architecture. The south elevation's main façade was specially designed to carry advertising and for most of its history was adorned with the store's trademark neon lights, arranged in the shape of spirals and supplemented with the vertically stacked letters "CDT", which stood for the store's original name 'Centralny Dom Towarowy' Central Department Store.

Inside the building, communication between floors was ensured with the construction of 6 main escalators and 4 elevators within a central stairwell, these were further supplemented by a multitude of other minor escalators and stairways; this made CDT the second building in Warsaw to use moving-stairway technology. The building has two major emergency exits which lead directly down to Bracka and Krucza streets.

The lobby of the store was originally decorated with terracotta wall tiling and oak flooring whilst the basement floor utilised reinforced concrete with glass and steel fittings; the use of these materials was then expanded to outfit the whole store. In addition to the standard fittings, a number of special pieces of art were commissioned for the interiors of the store, these included both sculpture and paintings, although they were usually of a distinctly modernist or post-modernist style.

Major fire of 1975
On Sunday, 21 September 1975, starting at sometime between 7 and 8 pm the Central Department Store caught fire. The fire initially struck the 6th floor, feeding on rich wall coverings, carpets and fabrics there. During the fire, pieces of the ceiling began to fall, and largely as a result of this, as well as the large number of escalators, the fire spread to another three floors of the building. Around 8.30 pm there was a large explosion which left a large amount of glass and other debris strewn across Krucza street and the Aleje Jerozolimskie.  Around 10 pm the entire building has been thoroughly burnt out and as the fire began reach plastic consumer goods, the flames provided a spectacular sight by turning light blue, purple and pink.

The Warsaw fire service finally managed to bring the fire under control and subsequently extinguish it shortly after midnight; and whilst the majority of the store was completely destroyed, the main concrete construction of the CDT fortunately survived. The cause of the fire was later assumed to have been caused by a faulty escalator motor which had malfunctioned, and then burnt out.

Afterwards, the state authorities decided to renovate the CDT. However, with the fire having completely destroyed the original interior and all its furnishings, the government believed that it would be too costly to replace everything in the hard economic times of the 1970s and so instead embarked upon a complete reconstruction of the building which changed much of its original appearance and never allowed it to regain its former glory. During the reconstruction most of the distinctive furniture as well as the whole of the glass façade were replaced with newer, less costly materials.

Fate and future of the Central Department Store
In the 80s the former "CDT", by now renamed "Smyk", became a member of the 'Central Department Stores' group. In 2000, the 'Smyk' chain was separated from the company's department stores line and  re-established as 'Smyk Sp. Zoo', a branded chain of stores with products for children. This separate line of children's stores has outlived its parent company and survives to this day. The current owner, 'CDI Smykowi', however, wants to restore the flagship Warsaw store to its former glory and re-open it as a full service department store, as was originally intended.

After the planned renovation, the building will look exactly as was imagined by its creators. The CDT will recover many of its original features, including its original rich facade with vertical and horizontal dividing lines and window frames of Polish oak. To the rear, it is proposed to build a new extension which will replace the original second and third blocks, which are of no real architectural merit and do not have listed building status. Perhaps most importantly, it is expected that the famous neon spirals and 'CDT' titles will again be affixed to the building's façade, and that the revitalised store will operate under its original three letter acronym.

The redevelopment project was prepared by Andrzej Chołdzyński and Wojciech Grabianowski.

Notes

References

External links 
 Naszemiasto Wydarzenia
 Artykul
 Architektura Nr 4 z 1952
 Architektura Nr 5 z 1948
 Architektura Nr 6 z 1958
 Express Wieczorny 19.07.1951
 Express Wieczorny 21.07.1951
 Express Wieczorny 24_27.12.1964
 Express Wieczorny 26.07.1951
 Express Wieczorny 28.11.1948
 Stolica Nr 3 z 1952
 Stolica Nr 15 z 1951
 Życie Warszawy 19.07.1951
 Życie Warszawy 21.09.1975
 Życie Warszawy 23.09.1975
 Życie Warszawy 31.01.1950
 Życie Warszawy 28.11.1948
 T. Przemysław Szafer "Współczesna architektura polska", Warszawa 1988, Arkady, str.55-57

Retail companies established in 1952
Department stores of Poland
Buildings and structures in Warsaw
Tourist attractions in Warsaw
Department store buildings
1952 establishments in Poland
Commercial buildings completed in 1952